Makar(a) Sankranti, also referred to as Uttarayana, Makar, or simply Sankranti, is a Hindu observance and a festival. Usually falling on the date of January 15 annually, this occasion marks the transition of the Sun from the zodiac of Sagittarius (dhanu) to Capricorn (makara). Since the Sun has made this transition which vaguely coincides with moving from south to north, the festival is dedicated to the solar deity, Surya, and is observed to mark a new beginning. Many native multi-day festivals are organised on this occasion all over India. 

The festivities associated with Makar Sankranti are known by various names Makara Sankranti in Kerala, Magh Bihu in Assam, Maghi Saaji in Himachal Pradesh, Maghi Sangrand in Punjab,  Maghi Sangrand or Uttarain (Uttarayana) in Jammu, Sakrat in Haryana, Sakraat in Rajasthan, Sukarat in central India, Pongal in Tamil Nadu, Uttarayana in Gujarat, and Uttar Pradesh, Ghughuti in Uttarakhand, Dahi Chura in Bihar, Makar Sankranti in Odisha, Karnataka, Maharashtra, Goa, West Bengal (also called Poush Sankranti or Mokor Sonkranti), Uttar Pradesh (also called Khichidi Sankranti), Uttarakhand (also called Uttarayani) or as simply, Sankranti in Andhra Pradesh and Telangana, Maghe Sankranti (Nepal), Songkran (Thailand), Thingyan (Myanmar), Mohan Songkran (Cambodia), Til Sakraat in Mithila, Maghe Sankranti Nepal, and Shishur Senkrath (Kashmir). On Makar Sankranti, the Sun god is worshipped along with Vishnu and goddess Lakshmi throughout India.

Makar Sankranti is observed with social festivities such as colourful decorations, rural children going house to house, singing and asking for treats in some areas, melas (fairs), dances, kite flying, bonfires and feasts. The Magha Mela, according to Indologist Diana L. Eck, is mentioned in the Hindu epic Mahabharata. Many observers go to sacred rivers or lakes and bathe in a ceremony of thanks to the sun. Every twelve years, the Hindus observe Makar Sankranti with Kumbha Mela – one of the world's largest mass pilgrimage, with an estimated 60 to 100 million people attending the event. At this event, they say a prayer to the sun and bathe at the Prayagaraj confluence of the River Ganga and River Yamuna, a tradition attributed to Adi Shankaracharya. Makar Sankranti is a time of celebration and thanks giving, and is marked by a variety of Rituals and tradition.

Date Variations 

Makar Sankranti is set by the solar cycle and corresponds to the exact time astronomical event of the Sun entering Capricorn and is observed on a day that usually falls on 14 January of the Gregorian calendar, but on 15 January in leap years. Makar Sankranti's date and time is analogous to Sidereal time of Zodiac sign of Capricorn (when sun enters).

The year is 365.24 days long and the time difference between the two consecutive instances of Makar Sankranti (Sidereal time of the Zodiac sign of Capricorn) is almost the same as the year. We only have 365 days in a year so in the time of four years Calendar lags by one day so we need to adjust it by leap day, 29 February. But Makar Sankranti falls before leap day correction is made therefore on every fourth year it falls on 15 January. Sidereal time of sign of Capricorn also shifts by a day due to leap year. Similarly, the time of Equinoxes also shifts by a day in each four years window. For example, Equinox of September does not fall on the same date each year nor does the winter solstice. Any event related to one revolution of the earth around the sun will have this date shift within 4 years cycle. Similar changes can be seen in the exact time of Solstices and equinoxes. See the table, how the time of the equinox and a Solstice increases and decreases in a cycle of four years.

We can see the time difference between two consecutive winter Solstices is about 5 hours 49 minutes 59 seconds, with respect to winter Solistice time, and the time difference between two consecutive Mankar Sankranti is about 6 hours and 10 minutes. Towards the end of the 21st Century, there will be more occurrences of Makar Sankranti on 15 January in a four-year cycle.
And Makar Sankranti (the Sidereal time of the Zodiac sign of Capricorn) will be on 16 January for the first in the year 2102 as 2100 will not be a leap year.

Makar Sankranti and Uttar Ayana 

Makar Sankranti is celebrated when the Sun's ecliptic longitude becomes 270° measured from a fixed starting point which is in opposition to Spica, i.e. this is a sidereal measure. Uttarayana begins when the Sun's ecliptic longitude becomes 270° measured from the Vernal equinox, i.e. this is a tropical measure. While both concern a measure of 270° their starting points are different. Hence, Makar Sankranti and Uttarayana occur on different days. On the Gregorian calendar, Makar Sankranti occurs on 14 or 15 January; Uttarayana starts on 21 December.

Due to the precession of the equinoxes the tropical zodiac (i.e. all the equinoxes and solstices) shifts by about 1° in 72 years. As a result, the December solstice (Uttarayana) is continuously but very slowly moving away from Makar Sankranti. Conversely, the December solstice (Uttarayana) and Makar Sankranti must have coincided at some time in the distant past. Such a coincidence last happened 1700 years back, in 291 AD .

Significance 
Every year Makar Sankranti is celebrated in the month of January. This festival is dedicated to the Hindu religious sun god Surya. This significance of Surya is traceable to the Vedic texts, particularly the Gayatri Mantra, a sacred hymn of Hinduism found in its scripture named the Rigveda. 

Makara Sankranti is regarded as important for spiritual practices and accordingly, people take a holy dip in rivers, especially Ganga, Yamuna, Godavari, Krishna and Kaveri. The bathing is believed to result in merit or absolution of past sins. They also pray to the sun and thank for their successes and prosperity. A shared cultural practices found amongst Hindus of various parts of India is making sticky, bound sweets particularly from sesame (til) and a sugar base such as jaggery (gud, gur, gul). This type of sweet is a symbolism for being together in peace and joyfulness, despite the uniqueness and differences between individuals. For most parts of India, this period is a part of early stages of the Rabi crop and agricultural cycle, where crops have been sown and the hard work in the fields is mostly over. The time thus signifies a period of socializing and families enjoying each other's company, taking care of the cattle, and celebrating around bonfires, in Gujarat the festival is celebrated by flying kites.

Makara Sankranti is an important pan-Indian solar festival, known by different names though observed on the same date, sometimes for multiple dates around the Makar Sankranti. It is known as Pedda Panduga in Andhra Pradesh, Makara Sankranti in Karnataka, Telangana, and Maharashtra, Pongal in Tamil Nadu, Magh Bihu in Assam, Magha Mela in parts of central and north India, as Makar Sankranti in the west, Makara Sankranti or Shankaranti in Kerala, and by other names.

Nomenclature and regional names

Makar or Makara Sankranti is celebrated in many parts of the Indian subcontinent with some regional variations. It is known by different names and celebrated with different customs in different Indian states and South Asian countries:

Sankranti, Makara Sankranti, Makara Sankramanam, Pedda Panduga: Andhra Pradesh, Telangana
Pusna: West Bengal, Assam, Meghalaya
 Suggi Habba, Makara Sankramana, Makara Sankranti: Karnataka
 Makar Sankranti, Uttarayana or Ghughuti: Uttarakhand
 Makar Sankranti or Makara Mela and Makara Chaula: Odisha
 Makar Sankranti or Sankaranti or Shankaranti: Kerala
 Makar Sankranti or Dahi Chura or Til Sankranti: Mithila Bihar
 Makar Sankranti, Maghi Sankranti, Haldi Kumkum or Sankranti: Maharashtra, Jammu, Goa, Nepal
 Hangrai: Tripura
 Pongal or Uzhavar Thirunal: Tamil Nadu, Sri Lanka, Singapore, Malaysia
 Uttarayana: Gujarat
 Maghi: Haryana, Himachal Pradesh Punjab 
 Magh Bihu or Bhogali Bihu: Assam
 Shishur Saenkraat: Kashmir Valley
 Sakraat or Khichdi: Uttar Pradesh and western Bihar
 Poush Sangkranti: West Bengal, Bangladesh
 Tila Sakrait: Mithila
 Tirmoori: Pakistan

In most regions of India, Sankranti festivities last for two to four days of which each day is celebrated with distinct names and rituals.

 Day 1 – Maghi (preceded by Lohri), Bhogi Panduga
 Day 2 – Makara Sankranti, Pongal, Pedda Panduga, Uttarayana, Magh Bihu
 Day 3 – Mattu Pongal, Kanuma Panduga
 Day 4 – Kaanum Pongal, Mukkanuma

Regional variations and customs

It is celebrated differently across the Indian subcontinent. Many people take a dip in places like Ganga Sagar and pray to the Sun God (Surya). It is celebrated with pomp in southern parts of India as Sankranti in Andhra Pradesh, Telangana and Karnataka (Pongal in Tamil Nadu), and in Punjab as Maghi.

Many melas or fairs are held on Makar Sankranti the most famous being the Kumbha Mela, held every 12 years at one of four holy locations, namely Haridwar, Prayag (Prayagraj), Ujjain and Nashik. The Magha Mela (or  mini-Kumbh Mela held annually at Prayag) and the Gangasagar Mela (held at the head of the Ganges River, where it flows into the Bay of Bengal). Makar Mela in Odisha. Tusu Mela also called as Tusu Porab is celebrated in many parts of Jharkhand and West Bengal. Poush Mela, held traditionally on the seventh day of Poush, at Shantiniketan, in West Bengal, is unrelated to this festival. Mela Maghi is held in memory of the forty Sikh martyrs (Chalis Mukte) who gave their lives to protect Guru Gobind Singh, the tenth Guru of Sikhism, every year at Muktsar Sahib in Punjab. Before this tradition, the festival was observed and mentioned by Guru Amar Das, the third Guru of Sikhism.

Andhra Pradesh and Telangana
The festival Sankranti  is celebrated for four days in Andhra Pradesh and Telangana. Telugu women decorate the entrance of their homes by geometric patterns drawn using colored rice flour, called Muggu. 
Day 1 – Bhogi 
Day 2 – Sankranti, the main festival day
Day 3 – Kanuma 
Day 4 – Mukkanuma
Bhogi

Bhogi is the first day of the four-day festival. It is celebrated with a bonfire with logs of wood, other solid-fuels, and wooden furniture at home that are no longer useful. In the evening, a ceremony called Bhogi Pallu, fruits of the harvest such as regi pallu and sugarcane are collected along with flowers of the season. Money is often placed into a mixture of treats and is poured over children. The children then collect the money and sweet fruits.

Sankranti
The second and main day of the four-day festival, and is dedicated to the Hindu god Surya. The day marks the start of the Uttarayana, when the sun enters the 10th house of the zodiac Makara. It is commonly called as Pedda Panduga (Big festival) in the Andhra Pradesh state. Ariselu, a traditional sweet dish is offered to the god.

Kanuma
The third day of the four-day festival, it is dedicated to the cattle and other domestic animals. The cattle are decorated, especially cows, they are offered bananas, a special meal and worshipped. On this day, popular community sport Kodi Pandem will begun playing until the next one to two days, especially in the Coastal Andhra region of Andhra Pradesh.

Mukkanuma
It is the fourth and last day of the four-day festival. Many families hold reunions on this day.

Assam

Magh Bihu (also called Bhogali Bihu (Bihu of eating foods and enjoyment) or Maghar Domahi is a harvest festival celebrated in Assam, India, which marks the end of harvesting season in the month of Maagha (January–February). It is the Assam celebration of Makar Sankranti, with feasting lasting for a week.

The festival is marked by feasts and bonfires. Young people erect makeshift huts, known as Meji and Bhelaghar, from bamboo, leaves and thatch, and in Bhelaghar they eat the food prepared for the feast, and then burn the huts the next morning. The celebrations also feature traditional Assamese games such as tekeli bhonga (pot-breaking) and buffalo fighting. Magh Bihu celebrations start on the last day of the previous month, the month of "Pooh", usually the 29th of Pooh and usually 14 January, and is the only day of Magh Bihu in modern times (earlier, the festival would last for the whole month of Magh, and so the name Magh Bihu). The night before is "Uruka" (28th of Pooh), when people gather around a bonfire, cook dinner, and make merry.

During Magh Bihu people of Assam make cakes of rice with various names such as Shunga Pitha, Til Pitha etc. and some other sweets of coconut called Laru or Laskara.

Bihar 
It is popularly known as Sakraat or Khichdi in western Bihar and Til Sakraat or Dahi Chura in rest of Bihar where people usually eat Dahi  and Chura (Flattened Rice),  sweets made of Til Sesame seeds and Chini (Sugar)/Gud(Jaggery) such as Tilkut, Tilwa (Til ke Ladoo) etc. In the state, the crops harvested around the time are Sesame Seeds, Paddy, etc

Goa
Known as Sankrant in Goa and like in the rest of the country, people distribute sweets in the form of granules of sugar-coated till pulses among family members and friends. Newly married women offer five sunghat or small clay pots with black beaded threads tied around them, to the deity. These pots are filled with newly harvested food grains and are offered with betel leaves and areca nut. Its observance takes place on a rather subdued note, unlike major festivals of the region like Ganesh chaturthi.

Gujarat

Uttarayana, as Makar Sankranti is called in Gujarati, is a major festival in the state of Gujarat which lasts for two days.

 14 January is Uttarayana
 15 January is Vasi-Uttarayana (Stale Uttarayana).

Gujarati people keenly await this festival to fly kites, called 'patang'. Kites for Uttarayana are made of special light-weight paper and bamboo and are mostly rhombus shaped with central spine and a single bow. The string often contains abrasives to cut down other people's kites.

In Gujarat, from December through to Makar Sankranti, people start enjoying Uttarayana. Undhiyu (spicy, baked mix of winter vegetables) and chikkis (made from til (sesame seeds), peanuts and jaggery) are the special festival recipes savoured on this day. The Hindu Sindhi community in western regions of India, that is also found in southeastern parts of Pakistan, celebrate Makar Sankranti as Tirmoori. On this day, parents sending sweet dishes to their daughters.

Haryana and Delhi

"Sakraant" in Haryana and Delhi rural areas, is celebrated with traditional Hindu rituals of North India similar to Western UP and border areas of Rajasthan and Punjab. This includes ritual purification by taking the holy dip in rivers, especially in Yamuna, or at sacred ponds such as ancient sarovars Kurukshetra and at local tirtha ponds associated with the ancestral guardian/founder deity of the village called Jathera or Dhok (dahak in Sanskrit or fire) in villages to wash away sins. People prepare kheer, churma, halva with desi ghee and distribute til-gud (sesame and jaggery) laddoos or chikkis. Brothers of married woman visits her home with a gift pack, called "Sindhara" or "Sidha", of wood and warm clothing for her and her husband's family. Women give gift to their in-laws called "Manana". Women congregate in the nearby havelis to sing Haryani folk songs and exchange gifts.

Jammu
In Jammu, Makar Sankranti is celebrated as 'Uttrain' (derived from Sanskrit: Uttarayana). Alternatively, terms 'Attrain' or 'Attrani' have also been used to describe this festival. A day before is celebrated as Lohri by Dogras to commemorate end of Poh (Pausha) month. It is also beginning of the Magha month as per Hindu Solar Calendar, hence also known as 'Maghi Sangrand' (Sankranti of Magh month).

Among Dogras, there is a tradition of 'Mansana' (charity) of Khichdi of Maah Dal. Khichdi of Maah di Dal is also prepared on this day and that is why this day is also referred to as 'Khichdi wala Parva'. There is also a tradition of sending Khichdi & other food items to house of married daughters. Fairs are organised on holy places and pligrimages on this day. Dhagwal in Hiranagar tehsil is known for Fair on Makar Sankranti and Janamashtami.

People of Jammu also take holy bath in Devika river and pilgrimages like Uttar Behni and Purmandal on this occasion. This day is also celebrated as birth anniversary of Baba Ambo ji, a local deity of Jammu region.

At Vasuki temple of Bhaderwah of Jammu, the idols of Vasuki Nag are covered on Magh Sankranti and they are uncovered only after three months on Vaisakha Sankranti

Karnataka

This is the Suggi (ಸುಗ್ಗಿ) or harvest festival for farmers of Karnataka. On this auspicious day, girls wear new clothes to visit near and dear ones with a Sankranti offering in a plate and exchange the same with other families. This ritual is called "Ellu Birodhu." Here the plate would normally contain "Ellu" (white sesame seeds) mixed with fried groundnuts, neatly cut dry coconut and fine cut bella (jaggery). The mixture is called "Ellu-Bella" (ಎಳ್ಳು ಬೆಲ್ಲ). The plate contains shaped sugar candy moulds (Sakkare Acchu, ಸಕ್ಕರೆ ಅಚ್ಚು) with a piece of sugarcane. There is a saying in Kannada "ellu bella thindu olle maathadi" that translates to 'eat the mixture of sesame seeds and jaggery and speak only good.' This festival signifies the harvest of the season, since sugarcane is predominant in these parts. Ellu Bella, Ellu Unde, bananas, sugarcane, red berries, haldi and kumkum and small gift items useful in everyday lives are often exchanged among women in Karnataka.
During the occasion, newly married women give away bananas for five years to married women from the first year of her marriage. Kite flying, drawing rangolis, giving away of red berries known as Yalchi kai are some of the intrinsic parts of the festival. Another vital ritual in rural Karnataka is the display of decorated cows and bulls and their procession is done and they are also made to cross a fire and this custom is known as "Kichchu Haayisuvudu".

Maharashtra

In Maharashtra, on Makar Sankranti day, people exchange til-gul (sweetmeats made from sesame seeds and jaggery).  A famous line associated with this joyous occasion is til gul ghya god god bola (Eat this sesame and jaggery and speak sweet words). Tilacha halwa (sugar granules) are also offered as prasad in the Devghar (Prayer room) after  seeking blessings. Gulachi poli is a popular flat bread stuffed with shredded jaggery and ground til in pure ghee are enjoyed for lunch as well as dinner. 

Married women invite friends/family members and celebrate Haldi-Kunku. Guests are given til-gul and some small gift, as a part of the ritual. On this day, Hindu women and men make it a point to wear black clothes. As Sakranti falls in the winter months of the region, wearing black adds to the body warmth. This is an essential reason behind wearing black, which is otherwise barred on festival days. As per another legend, Lord Surya forgave his son Shani and his son visited him on Sankranti. That is the essential reason why people distribute sweets and urge them to let go of any negative or angry feelings. Also, newly married women offer five sunghat or small clay pots with black beaded threads tied around them, to the Shakti deity. These pots are filled with newly harvested food grains and are offered with betel leaves and areca nut. Its observance takes place on a rather subdued note, unlike major festivals of the region like Ganesh Chaturthi.

Odisha

The festival is known as Makara Sankranti in Odisha where people prepare makara chaula: uncooked newly harvested rice, banana, coconut, jaggery, sesame, rasagola, Khai/Liaa and chhena puddings for naivedya to gods and goddesses. The withdrawing winter entails a change in food habits and intake of nourishing and rich food. Therefore, this festival holds traditional cultural significance. It is astronomically important for devotees who worship the sun god at the great Konark temple with fervour and enthusiasm as the sun starts its annual swing northwards. According to various Indian calendars, the Sun's movement changes and the days from this day onwards become lengthier and warmer and so the Sun-God is worshiped on this day as a great benefactor. Many individuals at the start of the day perform a ritual bath while fasting. Makara Mela (Fun fair) is observed at Dhabaleswar in Cuttack, Hatakeshwar at Atri in Khordha, Makara Muni temple in Balasore and near deities in each district of Odisha. In Puri special rituals are carried out at the temple of Lord Jagannath. In Mayurbhanj, Keonjhar, Kalahandi, Koraput and Sundargarh where the tribal population is greater, the festival is celebrated with great joy. They celebrate this festival with great enthusiasm, singing, dancing and generally having an enjoyable time. This Makara Sankranti celebration is next to the Odia traditional new year Maha Vishuva Sankranti which falls in mid April. Tribal groups celebrate with traditional dancing, eating their particular dishes sitting together, and by lighting bonfires.

Punjab

In Punjab, Makar Sankranti is celebrated as Maghi which is a religious and cultural festival. Bathing in a river in the early hours on Maghi is important. Hindus light lamps with sesame oil as this is supposed to give prosperity and drive away all sins. A major mela is held at Sri Muktsar Sahib on Maghi which commemorates a historical event in Sikh history.

Rajasthan and Western Madhya Pradesh (Malwa and Nimar)
"Makar Sankrati" or "Sakraat" in the Rajasthani language is one of the major festivals in the state of Rajasthan. The day is celebrated with special Rajasthani delicacies and sweets such as pheeni (either with sweet milk or sugar syrup dipped), til-patti, gajak, kheer, ghevar, pakodi, puwa, and til-laddoo.

Specially, the women of this region observe a ritual in which they give any type of object (related to household, make-up or food) to 13 married women. The first Sankranti experienced by a married woman is of significance as she is invited by her parents and brothers to their houses with her husband for a big feast. People invite friends and relatives (specially their sisters and daughters) to their home for special festival meals (called as "Sankrant Bhoj"). People give out many kind of small gifts such as til-gud (jaggery), fruits, dry khichadi, etc. to Brahmins or the needy ones.

Kite flying is traditionally observed as a part of this festival. On this occasion the sky in Jaipur and Hadoti regions is filled with kites, and youngsters engage in contests trying to cut each other's strings.

Tamil Nadu, Puducherry, and Sri Lanka

It is a four-day festival in South India and Sri Lanka:
 Day 1: Bhogi Pandigai (போகி பண்டிகை)
 Day 2: Thai Pongal (தை பொங்கல்)
 Day 3: Maattu Pongal (மாட்டுப் பொங்கல்)
 Day 4: Kaanum Pongal (காணும் பொங்கல்)

The festival is celebrated four days from the last day of the Tamil month Margazhi to the third day of the Tamil month Thai (Pausha).

Bhogi
The first day of festival is Bhogi (போகி). It is celebrated on the last day of Margazhi by throwing away and destroying old clothes and materials, by setting them on fire, marking the end of the old and the emergence of the new. In villages there will be a simple ceremony of "Kappu Kattu" (kappu means secure). The 'neem' leaves are kept along the walls and roof of the houses. This is to eliminate evil forces.

Thai Pongal

The second day of festival is Thai Pongal or simply Pongal.  It is celebrated by boiling rice with fresh milk and jaggery in new pots, which are later topped with brown sugar, cashew nuts and raisins early in the morning and allowing it to boil over the vessel. This tradition gives Pongal its name. The moment the rice boils over and bubbles out of the vessel, the tradition is to shout "பொங்கலோ பொங்கல் (Ponggalo Ponggal)!" and blow the sangu (a conch), a custom practised to announce it was going to be a year blessed with good tidings. Then, new boiled rice is offered to the Sun god during sunrise, as a prayer which symbolises thanks to the sun for providing prosperity. It is later served to the people in the house for the ceremony. People prepare savouries and sweets such as vadai, murukku, payasam and visit each other and exchange greetings.

Maattu Pongal

The third day of festival is Maattu Pongal (மாட்டுப் பொங்கல்). It is for offering thanks to cattle, as they help farmers in agriculture. On this day the cattle are decorated with paint, flowers and bells. They are allowed to roam free and fed sweet rice and sugar cane. Some people decorate the horns with gold or other metallic covers. In some places, Jallikattu, or taming the wild bull contest, is the main event of this day and this is mostly seen in the villages.

Kaanum Pongal
The fourth day of the festival is Kaanum Pongal (காணும் பொங்கல்: the word kaanum means "to view"). During this day people visit their relatives, friends to enjoy the festive season. It is a day to thank relatives and friends for their support in the harvest. It started as a farmers festival, called as Uzhavar Thirunaal in Tamil. Kolam (கோலம்) decorations are made in front of the house during Thai Pongal festival.

Kerala
In Kerala, this is called as Sankranti or Makara Sankranti. In Malabar villages, this used to be celebrated as the victory over a demon. In Sabarimala, on this day, the Makaravilakku is lit.

Tripura
The Tripuri is the promoter of Hangrai festivals. They have first introduced this festival of immersing of ancestors' remains in the holy river. Since then it was adopted by other groups in India and popularized over the years.

Mythology inform us that when the world was just created by Lord Siva or Sibrai there was only the grassland and nothing was present. The god then created an egg to produce a human being. The egg hatched to give birth to a human being, creating a big bang. He crawled out of eggshells and looked around for anyone like him, but he found none. There was total silence, peace tranquility, and harmony on the earth. He was frightened by seeing this scenario of earth. He remained near the eggshell most of the time and went back near to the empty eggshell, went inside of half of the shell and covered it with another one, and hid there.

The almighty God was upset by this development. Years later he created another egg, and after ten months it hatched. There was a big bang when it hatched that shook the earth and gave birth to another human. He was very courageous and powerful, as soon as he came out of the human eggshell, he started shouting and announced to the whole of the world, 'I am the first to be born in this earth, I am the eldest on the earth, no one is elder to me in this earth. He named himself Subrai and declared to the whole of the earth that he is the ruler of this earth and king of this universe. Hearing the big bang Hangrai got more frightened, closed his eyes, and silently remained inside the shell. But when he heard the voice like his own, he came out of his shell and met Subrai. At this Subrai told that he is older than Hangrai, since then Subrai became the elder brother of Hangrai, and people knew them as it is.

Thousand of years later when they grew older, the time had come to leave this world. As Hangrai grew older than Subrai, one day he felt sick very seriously, Hangrai was on his death bed, Subrai was taking care of him. Then god came before them and said, 'Among both of you, Hangrai is elder than Subrai, I only know this, because I have created both of you. Hangrai will leave this earth very soon. Subrai will do all necessary rituals to cremate the body of Hangrai.' And god disappeared from there.

Then Subrai cried like a baby, touching the feet of Hangrai, saying, 'Elder brother, I have treated you like a younger brother for thousands of years, forgive me for my wrongdoing unto you.'

Hangrai said, 'I have done so!' and touched his head as gesture of forgiving and blessing unto him, and then breadth for his last.

After the death of Hangrai, his younger brother Subrai cremated his body and did all the rituals, and immerged Hangrai's remaining in the holy water of the river on the last day of Pousa month. Since then, people observed these rituals and festivals every year and continued to this day. That is why the day is named "Hangrai", which has later adopted by other ethnic groups of people of India.

Every year on the day of Hangrai the Tripuri people observe it in grand pomp and show. In every house of Tripuri preparation for Hangrai starts two-three days before. Houses are cleaned, washed whitewashed. All the utensils, clothes, articles are cleaned, homes are decorated. Different types of Tripura cakes, dishes, and drinks are prepared, near and dear ones, relatives are invited for a feast.

Uttar Pradesh
The festival is known as Kicheri in Purvanchal and Awadh parts of Uttar Pradesh and involves ritual bathing. Over two million people gather at their respective sacred places for this holy bathing such as Prayagraj and Varanasi in Uttar Pradesh and Haridwar in Uttarakhand.  The day at a domestic household begins by taking ritual bath before sunrise, doing ritualistic prayers to the rising Sun. It also includes pledging for and donating Food, clothing and money to Brahmin/s called Purohita. It is followed by generous gifting of Food, Clothing, jewelleries and money to female relatives like to married Daughters, Sisters and Daughter-in-Laws and their families.
Sesame seeds, Jaggery, chiura and Yogurt are eaten post the prayers. This is followed by Khichdi as the next meal (hence the vernacular name of the Festival).

Uttarakhand
Makar Sankranti is a popular festival in Uttarakhand. It known by various names in the different parts of the state such as Uttarayani, Khichri Sangrand, Pusyodia, Ghughutia, Ghughuti Tyar, Kale Kauva, Makrain, Makraini, Gholda, Gwalda and Chunyatyar.

In the Kumaon region of Uttarakhand, Makar Sankranti (also called as Ghughuti (घुघुति) or Ghughuti Tyar or Ghughutia or Kale Kauva or Uttarayani) is celebrated with great gusto. The famous Uttarayani mela (fair) is held in Bageshwar town each year in the month of January on the occasion of Makar Sankrati. According to the Almora Gazetteer, even in the early twentieth century, the annual Uttarayani mela at Bageshwar was visited by approximately 15,000 people and was the largest fair of Kumaon division. The religious ritual of the Uttarayani mela consists of bathing before daybreak at the confluence of Saryu and Gomati followed by an offering of water to Lord Shiva inside the Bagnath Temple. Those who are more religiously disposed, continue this practice for three days in succession, which is known as "Trimaghi". On this day, people also give 'khichdi' (a dish made by mixing pulses and rice) in charity, take ceremonial dips in holy rivers, participate in Uttarayani fairs and offer deep fried sweetmeats consisting of flour and jaggery to crows and other birds as a way to pay homage to the departed souls of their ancestors.

West Bengal

In West Bengal, Sankranti, also known as Poush Sankranti named after the Bengali month in which it falls (last date of that month), is celebrated as a harvest festival Poush Parbon (Bengali: পৌষ পার্বণ). (It falls on 14 January on the Western calendar.) The freshly harvested paddy and the date palm syrup in the form of Khejurer Gur (Bengali: খেজুরের গুড়) and Patali (Bengali: পাটালি) is used in the preparation of a variety of traditional Bengali sweets made with rice flour, coconut, milk and 'khejurer gur' (date palm jaggery) and known as 'Pitha' (Bengali: পিঠে). All sections of society participate in a three-day festival that begins on the day before Sankranti and ends on the day after. The Goddess Lakshmi is usually worshipped on the day of Sankranti.

In the Himalayan regions of Darjeeling, the festival is as known as Magey Sakrati. It is distinctly associated with the worship of Lord Shiva. Traditionally, people bathe at sunrise and then commence their pooja. Elsewhere, many people take a dip in places like Ganga Sagar (the point where the river Ganges meets the Bay of Bengal). Ganga Sagar falls in West Bengal.

Outside India

Bangladesh

Shakrain is an annual celebration of winter in Bangladesh, observed with the flying of kites.

Nepal
Maghe Sankranti is a Nepalese festival observed on the first of Magha in the Vikram Sambat (B.S) calendar (about 14 January). Tharu people celebrate this particular day as new year. It is also regarded as the major government declared annual festival of the Magar community.

Observant Hindus take ritual baths during this festival. These include Sankhamul on the Bagmati near Patan; In the Gandaki/Narayani river basin at Triveni, Devghat near Chitwan Valley and Ridi on the Kaligandaki; and in the Koshi River basin at Dolalghat on the Sun Koshi. Festive foods like laddoo, ghee and sweet potatoes are distributed.

Pakistan (Sindh)
On this festive day, Sindhi parents send ladoos and chiki (Laaee) made of sesame seeds to their married daughters. The Sindhi community in India too celebrate Makar Sankranti as Tirmoori which involves parents sending sweet dishes to their daughters.

Sri Lanka, Malaysia, Singapore, Canada, Australia, America and some Europe countries
On this day, the Tamil farmers and the Tamil People honour the Sun God Suriya Narayanan. This happens when the sun enters the zodiac sign of Capricorn (Makara). The Thai Pongal festival is celebrated in mid-January, or the Tamil month of Thai, to coincide with the rice harvest.

See also
 Astronomical basis of the Hindu calendar
 List of Hindu festivals
 Jallikattu
 List of harvest festivals
 Uttarayana

References

External links

Religious festivals in India
Festivals in Maharashtra
Hindu festivals in Nepal
Gujarati culture
Hindu astronomy
Hindu festivals
January observances
Public holidays in Nepal
Bengali festivals
Punjabi festivals
Winter festivals
Hindu festivals in India
Observances set by the Vikram Samvat calendar
Religious festivals in Bangladesh
Harvest festivals